The 2013 Iowa State Cyclones football team represented Iowa State University in the 2013 NCAA Division I FBS football season. Playing as a member of the Big 12 Conference (Big 12), the team was led by head coach Paul Rhoads, in his fifth year and played its home games at Jack Trice Stadium in Ames, Iowa.

The Cyclones played in record setting temperatures: the hottest Jack Trice Stadium game at 92 °F vs. Northern Iowa on August 31, 2013, and the coldest Jack Trice Stadium game at 8 °F for kickoff and 3 °F by the start of the second half vs. Kansas on November 23, 2013.

On December 1, 2013, offensive coordinator Courtney Messingham and running backs coach Kenith Pope were fired from their positions.

Personnel

Coaching staff

Schedule

Schedule source:

Game summaries

Game 1: vs. Northern Iowa Panthers

Game 2: vs. Iowa Hawkeyes

Game 3: at Tulsa Golden Hurricane

Game 4: vs. Texas Longhorns

Game 5: at Texas Tech Red Raiders

Game 6: at Baylor Bears

Game 7: vs. Oklahoma State Cowboys

Game 8: at Kansas State Wildcats

Game 9: vs. TCU Horned Frogs

Game 10: at Oklahoma Sooners

Game 11: vs. Kansas Jayhawks

Game 12: at West Virginia Mountaineers

References

Iowa State
Iowa State Cyclones football seasons
Iowa State Cyclones football